Xing Yi Quan is classified as one of the internal styles of Chinese martial arts. The name of the art translates approximately to "Form-Intention Fist", or "Shape-Will Fist".

Xing Yi is characterized by aggressive, seemingly linear movements and explosive power that's most often applied from a short range. A practitioner of Xing Yi uses coordinated movements to generate bursts of power intended to overwhelm the opponent, simultaneously attacking and defending. Methods vary from school to school, but always include bare-handed fighting training (mostly in single movements/combinations and sometimes in forms) and the training of weapons usage with similar or identical body mechanics to that used for bare-handed  intense fighting. The most basic notions of movement and body mechanics in the art were heavily influenced by the practice of staves and spears.
Historically and technically related martial arts include Dai Xin Yi Liu He Quan, Liu He Xin Yi Quan and Yi Quan.

Origins

Legends

The earliest written records of Xing Yi can be traced to the 18th century, and are attributed to Ma Xueli of Henan Province and Dai Long Bang of Shanxi Province. Legend credits the creation of Xing Yi to renowned Song Dynasty (9601279 AD) general Yue Fei, but this is disputed.

According to the book Henan Orthodox Xingyi Quan written by Pei Xirong and Li Ying'ang, Xing Yi Dai Long Bang "...wrote the Preface to Six Harmonies Boxing in the 15th reign year of the Qianlong Emperor [1750]. Inside it says, '...when Yue Fei was a child, he received special instructions from Zhou Tong. Extremely skilled in spearfighting, he used the spear to create fist techniques and established a skill called Yi Quan' (意拳). Meticulous and unfathomable, this technique far outstripped ancient ones."

於乾隆十五年為「六合拳」作序云：「岳飛當童子時，受業於周侗師，精通槍法，以槍為拳，立法以教將佐，名曰意拳，神妙莫測，蓋從古未有之技也。

According to legend, throughout the Jin, Yuan and Ming Dynasties few individuals had studied this art, one of them being Ji Gong (also known as Ji Longfeng and Ji Jike) of Shanxi Province. After Yue Fei's death, the art was 'lost' for half a millennium. Then, during the Ming and Qing Dynasties in Shaanxi Province's Zhongnan Mountains, Yue Fei's boxing manual was said to have been discovered by Ji Gong. It is more likely though that Ji Jike had created the art based on prior martial arts experience, or passed on an art that had already existed.

General history (ancient times – 20th century)
Yang Jwing-Ming (who is not a practitioner of the art) argues that aspects of Xing Yi Quan (particularly the animal styles) are identifiable as far back as the Liang Dynasty at the Shaolin Temple. According to Jwing-Ming, Yue Fei therefore did not strictly invent Xing Yi Quan, but synthesized and perfected existing Shaolin principles into his own style of gongfu which he popularized during his military service. Nonetheless, according to Yang, Yue Fei is usually identified as the creator because of his considerable understanding of the art (as shown in the work The Ten Theses of Xingyiquan, credited to Yue) and his cultural status as a Chinese war hero. It ought be noted that in Chinese culture, it is common to attribute the creation of great traditions to legendary individuals. In such a way, the art of Tai Ji Quan is attributed to the legendary Zhang Sanfeng, and Daoism to Laozi, even though as in the case with Yue Fei, there exists no proof for such claims.

Other martial artists and Chinese martial art historians, such as Dan Miller, Tim Cartmell, and Brian Kennedy, hold that this story is largely legendary; while Xing Yi Quan may well have evolved from military spear techniques, there is no evidence to support that Yue Fei was involved or that the art dates to the Song dynasty. These authors point out that the works attributed to Yue Fei's role long postdate his life, some being as recent as the Republican era, and that it was common practice in China to attribute new works to a famous or legendary person, rather than take credit for oneself. One source claims that the author of the "preface" is unknown, since no name is written on the manuscript. Most practitioners just assume it was written by Dai Long Bang. Some researchers of martial arts believe that it was actually written in Shanxi during the final years of the 19th century. In addition, historical memoirs and scholarly research papers only mention Zhou Tong teaching Yue archery and not spear play. Yue historically learned spear play from Chen Guang (陳廣), who was hired by the boy's paternal grandfather, Yao Daweng (姚大翁).

Beginning in the late Ming era and Ji Longfeng's time, evidence for the art's history grows firmer. Ji Longfeng, also known as Ji Jike, is the first person which all agree had both existed and practiced the art. Ji Longfeng's contributions to the art are described in the Ji Clan Chronicles (姬氏族譜; pinyin: Ji Shi Zupu). Like the Preface, the Chronicles describes Xing Yi Quan as a martial art based on the combat principles of the spear. The Chronicles, however, attributes this stylistic influence to Ji himself, who was known as the "Divine Spear" (神槍; pinyin: Shén Qiāng) for his extraordinary skill with the weapon. Nowadays, many believe that the style Ji Longfeng was taught had been Shaolin Xin Yi Ba (a style which still exists today, and bears minute resemblance to XinYi LiuHe Quan). Ji Longfeng referred to his art as Liu He, The Six Harmonies, a reference to the most highly developed spear style practiced in the late Ming military.

Some speculate that during that period in the development of the art, either Ji Longfeng or some of his students had a connection with monks at the famous Shaolin Temple on Song Mountain. There exists a martial art called 'Xin Yi Ba', which is still taught at the general location of the temple, and bears a few similarities to Xing Yi related styles. Some claim that Shaolin Xin Yi Ba had been taught to the Shaolin monks by Ji Longfeng's line, while others hold the view that Ji Longfeng was taught martial arts by the monks.

From Ji Longfeng, the art was passed down to Cao Jiwu. From Cao Jiwu, the art split into its two biggest branches. One branch came down from Cao's student Ma Xueli, and became Xin Yi Liu He Quan – an art still widely practiced today, which compared to other lineages, have not undergone many changes over the generations. The other branch that came down from Cao Jiwu was through his other student, Dai Longbang. The latter passed the art into the Dai clan, which had made many changes to it, mixing it with several arts and skills that had already existed in the Dai family. The art remains in the Dai clan to this day, but has also spread elsewhere in China and around the world.

The art remained fairly obscure until Li Luoneng (also known as Li Nengran) learned the art from the Dai family in the 19th century. It was Li Luoneng and his successors — which include Guo Yunshen, Song Shirong, Che Yizhai, Liu Qilan and Li Taihe (who would popularize Xing Yi Quan across Northern China).

It is known that Li Luoneng was proficient in other martial arts before studying Dai clan's Xin Yi. Some claim his original art was Qimen Quan (奇門拳), perhaps his family's style, while others believe he actually studied Tongbei Quan and Gongli Quan. Li came to study under the Dai family either because he heard of their fame in the martial arts and business, or maybe as suggested by others, after having fought and lost to a practitioner of their art. It is generally agreed he then settled in the area of their village, and grew and sold vegetables, which earned him the nickname 'Li Lao Nong' 李老農 (Old Farmer Li, but also 'Respectable Farmer Li'). Initially, members of the Dai clan refused to teach him, but he eventually won over their trust, and he was taught by Dai Wenxiong, Guo Weihan, or both. After learning Dai Xin Yi for a number of years, perhaps over a decade, Li left the Dai territories and traveled across Shanxi and Hebei provinces, teaching for many years his own elaboration on the art, now called 'Xing Yi Quan'. No reasons were ever recorded for the many changes Li made to the art, but there are those who claim that Li wished to compete with the Dai clan's fame, perhaps because of some grudge. Li and many of his students and grand-students were famous for offering bodyguard and caravan escort services.

Recent history (20th and 21st centuries)
A condensed version of Xing Yi Quan was taught to Chinese officers at the Military Academy at Nanjing during the Second Sino-Japanese War for close quarters combat. This included armed techniques such as bayonet and sabre drills alongside unarmed techniques.

Sun Lutang, a later exponent of the art, became famous in the early 20th century for his skills (chiefly in the Beijing and Tianjin areas), and for the martial books he had written about the Internal arts. During Sun Lutang's lifetime and martial 'career', he and several of his contemporaries began to classify Xing Yi, together with Taiji Quan and Bagua Zhang, as 'Wudang Martial Arts' style. Sun also exchanged knowledge with his friend and colleague Fu Zhensong, who subsequently took this branch of the art to southern China (after it had been mostly practiced in the northern parts of the country for centuries). Later, many others have spread the art across China and the world. Yi Quan, which had been evolved from Xing Yi Quan by Wang Xiangzhai, became especially widespread during the 20th century, in China and across the world.

Following the Cultural Revolution in China, some Xing Yi forms have been adapted to fit the needs of modern practitioners of the competitive sport of Wushu. This meant that various movement forms from the art were adapted to a competitive format, in which the emphasis was put on aesthetics and flowery movements, rather than on fighting. The style is nonetheless relatively rare in wushu competitions because all wushu practitioners must compete in several mandatory events, which make Xing Yi, a non-mandatory art, a secondary priority in wushu competitive circles.

As there had never been a single organizational body governing the teaching of the art, several variant styles and sub-styles developed. Although there are classical texts which include specific encoded instructions and general guidelines for practice, many of these are ignored by most modern practitioners, and interpreted in different ways by those who follow their instruction (this is depicted in the lineage chart further down this page). As a result, over the decades and especially over the last few dozen years, branches of the art have considerably differentiated and diverged. This trend was strengthened by cross influences various Xing Yi teachers had from other martial arts and martial artists, and the spread of Xing Yi to the Western World.

The art began to be taught in the West somewhere along the 1960s–1970s. However, it only rose to prominence among martial arts communities worldwide during the first decade of the 21st century. Currently, it is still not well known among the general public. One explanation for this situation is that unlike other traditional oriental martial arts, Xing Yi was not a notable style in movies which became popular in the West (and though a modified 'wushu' version of it appeared in The One, starring Jet Li, this was not told or hinted to the viewers as part of that film's script).

Arguably, the most common Xing Yi Quan lineage in the West today is of the Yi Zong branch, which came down from Zhang Junfeng. Many of Zhang's students and grand-students, such as Kenneth Fish (martial artist), Hung I-Hsiang, Su Dongchen, Luo Dexiu, Xu Hongji and others have been teaching his Xing Yi to Westerners since the 1980s – especially Americans. This branch became the most popular because Taiwan was open to Westerners during the 20th century, while throughout much of that century, the Communist regime on mainland China did not allow Westerners to visit regularly, and thus people were not exposed to branches of the art from the mainland. Contrary to popular belief, spread by some Taiwanese teachers, the art had not 'died out' on the mainland, but was simply inaccessible to outsiders for several decades (proof of this is that many lineages of the art discussed and referenced on this page had survived The Great Leap Forward and The Cultural Revolution). Another popular Taiwanese branch in the West is Wang Shujin's lineage, which was chiefly transmitted by his student Wang Fulai.

There are also several lineages from Tianjin which are nowadays taught in the West, namely in Canada and Israel. Lines of Dai XinYi and XinYi LiuHe are still rare in the West, and can be said to even be relatively rare in China, though they are not at risk of becoming 'extinct'. In the United States, Dai XinYi is taught by Li Tailiang and several of his students. Yi Quan, on the other hand, has become exceedingly popular in the West, being taught in many schools, especially in Europe. There are no statistics as to the number of practitioners in any of these arts in either China or other countries.

Disputed history
Ancient Chinese texts, like those which make up the 'Xing Yi Classics', often contain characters whose meanings are obscure or have disappeared completely from the Chinese language. Specialized terms which describe historically specific concepts (names of ancient weapons for example) are commonly interpreted with regards for their closest, modern linguistic equivalent. The results can be problematic, producing translations which are linguistically correct but inconsistent within a fighting or martial context.

The recognized founder of Bagua Zhang, Dong Hai Chuan, was reputed to have fought Guo Yunshen with neither able to defeat the other – though it is possible that they were training together. It would have been controversial at the time for Dong Hai Chuan to have studied under Guo Yunshen, since Dong was the older of the two. The most neutral viewpoint would be to say that they trained together, which may explain the stylistic similarities between Bagua Zhang and the Xing Yi Quan monkey shape. Frantzis argues that this encounter never took place and that Guo and Dong had little contact with each other. Frantzis argues that a Xing Yi - Bagua exchange was more likely to have occurred in Tianjin c. 1900 where xingyi masters Li Cunyi and Zhang Zhaodong, Bagua master Cheng Tinghua, and four other xingyi and bagua teachers lived together (Frantzis, 1998, p. 179).
Sun Lutang states in his autobiography that the legendary fight between Guo Yunshen and Dong Hai Chuan never happened. The book states that the truth of the matter is that Guo Yunshen actually fought one of his older xingyi brothers and lost. Sun Lutang was a student of both Guo Yunshen and Cheng Tinghua so this stance on the subject seems to be one of the most accurate.
Treating the story of Dong Hai Chuan and Guo Yunshen as allegory, however, reveals a common training protocol among Xing Yi Quan and Bagua Zhang practitioners. Often, because Bagua Zhang requires significantly more time for a practitioner's skill to mature, it is acceptable to learn Xing Yi Quan first or simultaneously. Such a practitioner develops a tactical vocabulary that is more readily apparent than the core Bagua Zhang movements.
 
For controversies concerning the teaching of one person by another, read under lineage chart further down this article.

Branches
From Cao Jiwu, the art split into two branches:
 Ma family's Xin Yi Liu He Quan.
 Dai family's Liu He Xin Yi Quan.

These two branches survive to this day. Later, Li Luoneng developed Xing Yi Quan out of the Dai family branch. From Li Luoneng's time onward, the art has been said to have three main developmental branches:
Shanxi  (including the Song- and Che-family sub-branches)
Hebei (Most commonly practiced Xing Yi Quan, and the branch Yi Quan evolved from).
Henan (an alternative name for Ma family's Xin Yi Liu He Quan).

However, the identification of three separate branches is tenuous because of the extensive cross-training that occurred across their lineages. This suggests that the branches did not evolve in isolation, thus diluting any major differences between them.

Schools of the Shanxi branch have a narrower stance, lighter footwork and tend to be more evasive. They emphasize the development of relaxation before the practice of intention (Yi). Schools of the Hebei branch emphasize Xing and Yi before developing a higher level of relaxed structure, and have a slightly different evasive footwork. Schools of the Henan branch are typically the most aggressive of the three.

The Henan branch is known as the Muslim branch because it was handed down within the Muslim community in Luoyang to which its founder, Ma Xueli, belonged. Henan branch is sometimes referred to by practitioners as XinYi LiuHe Quan instead of simply Xing Yi Quan. This may be attributed to the fact that the Muslim community of China was historically a very closed culture in order to protect themselves as a minority, thus retaining the older addition to the name of Xingyi. Liuhe means "Six Harmonies" and refers to the six harmonies of the body (three external harmonies: wrists-ankles, elbows-knees, shoulders-hips; three internal harmonies: xin-yi, yi-qi, qi-li i.e. spirit or "emotional mind" (xin) harmonises with your intention (yi), intention harmonises with your breath and physical momentum (qi), breath and physical momentum harmonise with your physical strength (li) that contribute to correct posture.) This is not to be confused with the separate internal art Liuhebafa.

Both the Shanxi and Hebei branches use a twelve animal system with five elements while the Henan branch uses ten animals. Depending on the lineage, it may or may not use five elements. Due to the historical complexity and vagueness of the lineages, it is uncertain which branch would constitute the "authentic" Xing Yi Quan.

In all of the following sections under this paragraph is chiefly discussed the art of Xing Yi Quan that had come down from Li Luoneng. These sections are not representative of Dai XinYi Quan or LiuHe XinYi Quan.

Characteristics and principles

Xing Yi Quan features aggressive shocking attacks and direct footwork. Most of the training and footwork are practiced on straight lines, but application occurs on all planes of movement. The linear nature of training in the art hints at both the military origins and the influence of spear technique alluded to in its mythology. The goal of the Xing Yi exponent is to reach the opponent quickly and drive power through him in a single burst, to close in and break your opponent's structure so they can neither attack nor defend. The analogy with spear fighting is useful here. This is achieved by coordinating one's body as a single unit, and the intense focusing of one's Intent (Yi 意) and coordinated power (Jin 勁) utilizing tight circles usually in a forward direction, but can be applied on all 6 directions of energy (forward, backward, left, right, up, and down). Issuing explosive power in Xing Yi is referred to as 'Fa Jin' (發勁), the same term used in many other traditional Chinese Martial Arts.

Despite its hard, angular appearance, cultivating "soft" internal strength is essential to achieving power in Xing Yi Quan. Also, the advanced practitioner always contains tight spirals within his movements, so even the seemingly direct and linear ones are circular on a very small scale. Such circles and spirals also exist in other martial arts, but Xing Yi (like Southern Praying Mantis) likes to keep them smaller than others.

Efficiency and economy of movement are the qualities of a Xing Yi stylist, and its direct fighting philosophy advocates simultaneous attack and defense. There are few kicks except for extremely low foot kicks (which avoids the hazards of balance involved with higher kicks) and some mid-level kicks, and techniques are prized for their working within key principles rather than aesthetic value.

Xing Yi Quan favours a training stance called Sān Tǐ Shì (三體勢 / 三体势), literally "three bodies power," referring to how the stance holds the head, torso and feet along the same vertical plane (As a Zhan Zhuang method, this stance is trained lower). In actual fighting a free-form traditional guard should be used in the application of intent (yi) rather than adhering to any aesthetic value, in training San Ti is more often trained at middle-low heights.

Like other Internal Arts, much of the training in Xing Yi Quan is done in slow-motion. This is true for almost all the movements in the art, though the majority of them can and are also trained explosively.

Overview of the art and its training methods

Zhan Zhuang (站樁)
This is a general name given to postures which one holds in place for prolonged periods of time – anywhere between 2 minutes and 2 hours. These postures are related to postures used in actual fighting, and are sometimes identical to them. Initially, these postures are taught as static training stances. After a short amount of time though, the practitioner would be taught how to move the muscles and connective tissues on a minute level from the inside of the body, making these stances very dynamic internally and more challenging to train. The most common Zhan Zhuang among all Xing Yi schools is San Ti Shi (it is the stance demonstrated by Sun Lutang in the picture at the beginning of the article). Other common stances are:  Hun Yuan Zhuang, Wu Ji Zhuang, Fu Hu Zhuang, Xiang Long Zhuang and their many variants. There are many reasons for training Zhan Zhuang. Among them are, in general:

 It is the simplest method to work on the training of one's Intent (Yi).
 They are used to develop one's martial structure.
 One can learn the bodily alignments of the art and perfect them in a more relaxed state.
 Correct breathing can be trained more methodically while holding Zhan Zhuang.
 There are certain health benefits involved in such training.

Some teachers consider Zhan Zhuang to be the most important practice in Xing Yi; whereas, others neglect to train and teach them altogether. The use of the Santi Shi (三體勢) Zhan Zhuang as the main training method in Xing Yi dates back to Li Luoneng, the founder of modern version of the art. In Dai XinYi, the central and most important training method is called 'Squatting Monkey' – a dynamic movement exercise rather than a static posture held in place. In the Geng Jishan/Deng Yunfeng/Rose Li tradition, the phrase Santi is sometimes replaced by "central equilibrium stance".

Since the 1980s, Zhan Zhuang has become more and more popular in other martial arts; many of which, such as some schools of Chen style Taiji, borrowed these methods from Xing Yi schools. Other martial arts sometimes had their own Zhan Zhuang methods beforehand. Today, the posture Hun Yuan Zhuang in particular has become a mainstay of many styles; its spread probably owing to the growing popularity of Yi Quan.

Plow stepping
Also called 'friction stepping' (Mo Ca Bu; 摩擦步), this exercise is meant to ingrain in the practitioner the correct forward-stepping habits and methods of Xing Yi, which are different from those of other arts (though similar to those found in some styles of Bagua Zhang). Plow stepping is a precursor to Xing Yi's 'Chicken Stepping', which is the faster and more explosive stepping method in the art. In Yi Quan, plow stepping had been replaced with 'mud stepping'.

Shi Li (試力) / Mo Jin
In many lineages, there is an intermittent stage between the stationary Zhan Zhuang and the more complex Five Elements (though this stage might also be taught following the Five Elements). The two names above are interchangeable for a few exercises developed to fulfill that purpose. Shi Li movements are basically simplified versions of the more advanced body mechanics and circles found in the Five Elements and the Animals. Their focus is on training one's structure and Yi, and can be thought of as 'Zhan Zhuang in movement'. They are usually trained very slowly, one movement at a time, repeating the same movement for many minutes on end. The more advanced practitioner many also spontaneously link up and flow between different Shi Li movements, or train them more explosively with Fa Jin (发劲). In Yi Quan, the original Five Elements and 12 Animals have all been 'condensed' and 'refined' into forms of Shi Li, which replace them as the core exercises in the art (together with Zhan Zhuang).

There also exists in certain lineages a type of Shi Li drill called Si Bu Pan Gen. It originated from Bagua Zhang, and is a form of tight Circle Walking – encircling a small square rather than a circle. The main purposes of it is to train evasive stepping and stretch the hip and groin regions (the Kua).

Five Element Shapes (Wǔ Xíng 五行)
Xing Yi uses movements called the five classical Chinese elements to metaphorically represent five different states of combat. Also called the "Five Fists" or "Five Phases", the Five Elements are related to Taoist cosmology although the names do not literally correspond to the cosmological terms. These five movements make the 'base' of the art, upon which all further combative knowledge and skill is built upon. Most schools will teach the five elements before the twelve animals because they are easier and shorter to learn (though eventually more difficult to master). The Five Elements do not appear in Henan XinYi LiuHe Quan, though similar movements and methods exist in that art's curriculum.

Each of the Five Element movements has many vectors of movement contained within it. Together, they are used to explore all the useful ways through which one could advance on a straight line. Each of the Elements may be used as a Zhan Zhuang in-itself, and in some schools this is encouraged.

A common saying originating from the Xing Yi classics is: "The hands do not leave the heart and the elbows do not leave the ribs". This is most evident in the Five Elements.

Some Xing Yi practitioners also use the five elements as an interpretative framework for reacting and responding to attacks. This follows the five element theory, a general combat formula which assumes two types of cyclic interactions and three types of adverse interactions. The two cyclic interactions are the mutual nourishment (constructive) and mutual restraint (destructive) cycles. The adverse reactions are lesser known and rarely trained but exist from the understanding that nothing would exist if the mutual nourishment and restraint cycles existed alone, the adverse reactions are mutual over-restraint (overwhelming destructive interaction), mutual reverse restraint (reversal of the destructive cycle), and mutual burdening (unbalancing or reversal of the constructive cycle). Practitioners abiding by these concepts train to react to and execute specific techniques in such a way that a desirable cycle will form based on these interactions of the five element theory. Where to aim, where to hit and with what technique, and how those motions should work defensively, is determined by what point of which cycle they see themselves in. Each of the elements has many variant applications that allow it to be used to defend against all of the elements (including itself), so any set sequences are ultimately entirely arbitrary in real combat but present a frame work for developing a more practical skill, the destructive cycle is often taught to 'beginners' as it is generally easier to visualize and consists of easier applications.

Animal Shapes (Shí'èr Xíng 十二形)
Xing Yi Quan is based on twelve distinct Animal Shapes (of which, ten animals are more common – see table below). Present in all regional and family styles, these animal movements emulate the techniques and tactics of the corresponding animal rather than just their physical movements. Many schools of Xing Yi Quan have only small number of movements for each animal, though some teach extended sequences of movements.

Ba Zi Gong
These are eight fighting combinations that exist in some lineages of the art. They emphasize direct combat applicability, and elaborate further on the movements vectors and powers explored and trained with the Five Elements. Sometimes, there exist two variations for the Ba Zi Gong – one for gongfu development, and another for actual fighting usage. There might also exist in a lineage a linking form for all 8 combinations. The eight Ba Zi Gong are:  Zhǎn 斬 (Cutting Down/Severing), Jié 截 (Intercepting), Guǒ 裹 (Wrapping), Kuà 挎 (Carrying), Tiāo 挑 (Lifting/Raising), Dǐng 頂 (Pushing Upwards), Lìng 令 (Leading) and Yún 雲 (Cloud).

Linking forms

Additionally to the Five Fists and animal shapes, many lineages employ the training of several additional movement forms – from a handful to a few dozen. Some of the more common forms are partner forms, which simulate combat scenarios. Once the individual animal shapes are taught, a student is often taught an animal linking form (shi'er xing lianhuan) which connects all the taught animals together in a sequence. Some styles have longer, or multiple forms for individual animals, such Eight Tiger Forms Huxing bashi. Other forms often link movements from the Five Fists, the different animal shapes, or both, and commonly include additional movements and techniques not found elsewhere. There also exist a Ba Zi Gong linking form and many weapons forms.

Weapons
Xing Yi Quan emphasizes a close relationship between the movements of armed/unarmed techniques. This technical overlap aims to produce greater learning efficiency.

Traditionally Xing Yi was an armed art. Students would train initially with the spear, progressing to shorter weapons and eventually empty-handed fighting. This gradually changed throughout the 20th century, as the emphasis in most traditional Chinese martial arts shifted from the use of weapons to fighting empty-handed. Weapon diversity is great in many lineages, with the idea being that an experienced Xing Yi fighter would be able to pick up almost any weapon available (or an object to use as such) irrespective of its exact length, weight and shape.

Common weapons in the art:

Spear. This is the most synonymous weapon with the art. Spears are usually 1.8–5 meters in length, though those over 3 meters long are meant solely for increasing training intensity and challenge, and historically people would not commonly fight with spears that large. The Five Fists of Xing Yi have variations which are trained with the spear.
Chinese straight sword
Chinese sabre

Less common weapons:

Large sabre (used by infantry against mounted opponents)
Long staff
Short staff (at maximum length you could hold between the palms of your hands at each end – techniques with this weapon may have been used with a spear that had been broken)
Needles (much like a double ended rondel gripped in the centre – on the battlefield this would mostly have been used like its western equivalent to finish a fallen opponent through weak points in the armour)
Fuyue (halberds of various types)
Chicken-sabre sickle. This weapon was supposedly created by Ji Longfeng and became the special weapon of the style. Its alternate name is "Binding Flower Waist Carry".

The Xing Yi Classics

A variety of Important texts have survived throughout the years, often called "Classics", "Songs" or "Theories". These texts use intentionally vague language to describe the principles and methods of practice in LiuHe XinYi Quan, Dai XinYi Quan and Xing Yi Quan. They are less relevant to more modern interpretations of these arts, such as Yi Quan. In the past, these text were copied by hand, and were kept secret.

The following is a list of the most commonly referred-to classical texts:

Classic of Unification
Classic of Fighting
Classic of Stepping
Classic of Six Harmonies

Much of these texts can be read in English.

Below is a picture of one book containing the classics, which belongs to Li Bo (李博) from Shijiazhuang, a teacher who claims to be a descendant of Li Luoneng, the founder of the art. This book is titled Wu Mu Quan Pu (武穆拳譜).

The three stages of training power (Jin 勁) in Xing Yi
Generally speaking, it is accepted that in Xing Yi (at least in Hebei-derived lineages), there are three stages to a practitioner's development of power and overall skill.
These three stages develop and change in parallel to all other training methods, and dictate the quality of one's training methods. The following is a description of these three stages (a translation of classic texts by Devlin G. Horrinek):

  Ming Jin 明勁 ('Clear-to-see Jin') – The strength and form must be strong, precise, and clear. Extend outward with force. When putting out force it must pass through, penetrate, pierce, connect, be pliant, ferocious, round, firm, have a shaking-cutting strength, and deliver explosive force. Practice and drill the hand techniques to develop the external 5-Elements and the elbows to develop the internal 5-Elements. Advancing and retreating with bent legs as if wading through mud (tang ni; refers to the practice and intent of Plow/Mud Stepping) like "walking while plowing through mud". This is the stage of Ming Jin.
  An Jin 暗勁 ('Hidden Jin') – One must have already grasped and have a strong foundation in the Ming Jin stage. Then you can start on the second stage. Now when using strength you contain it and don't reveal it on the outside. Store up (xu) but don't emit (fa). Deliberately store up your Jin. The power to 'fa' emit is held back but not released, to the opponent this feels very powerful and strange and then you can emit. This is called "Treading on thin Ice" [And the feeling is like when walking on an iced-over lake and never knowing when, or if, you're going to break through the ice.]. This is the stage of An Jin.
  Hua Jin 化勁 ('Transforming Jin') – This is considered the highest stage of practice. You must have already grasped the stages of Ming Jin and An Jin and have a very strong foundation in them. You should have a lot of experience in fighting as you must know that this stage is 'Sheji Cong Ren' (same as in Taijiquan). Give up yourself and comply with the opponent. Use 'Zhan, Lian, Nian, and Sui' (sticky, link, adhering, and complying). Everywhere you need to be empty and not exerting strength. The whole body must be blending and smooth (hun yuan – smooth roundness) and not starting and stopping. This is the skill of 'The opponent does not know me, I alone know the opponent.' At any time, place, or moment you can emit (fa), but only emitting force at the precise moment. This is the Hua Jing stage.

Famous practitioners
Since the validity of lineages are often controversial, this list is not intended to represent any lineage. Names are presented in alphabetical order using pinyin romanization.

Lineage chart
The following chart, created by Shifu Jonathan Bluestein and Shifu Nitzan Oren, demonstrates the historical connections between most known lineages of Xing Yi Quan, and related martial arts. The chart is a collaborative project between Mr. Bluestein, who created the bulk of it, and several dozen Xing Yi Quan teachers from the West, who contributed information on their lineages and those of others. The chart project is well known in the Xing Yi Quan community, and the information contained in it has never been disputed (further contributions, suggestions and objections may be made by directly contacting Mr. Bluestein, at:  jonathan.bluesteingmail.com). An attempt was made to include as many notable teachers as possible, but due to the obvious constraints of space, not all could have been included. Disciples are marked by a direct, full, downward-flowing line. Regular students are marked with a broken line.

Herein is a list of references to sources specifying various lineages of Xing Yi Quan, supporting the content presented on the chart.

Please note that a few minor details on the chart concerning people who had lived and taught prior to the 20th century are still somewhat controversial. This is due to a lack of profound historical documentation.

One of the more debated questions in this regard is who had been the teacher of Li Luoneng, the founder of modern Xing Yi Quan. It is known that Li studied with the Dai clan, but remains unclear who taught him. Some people and lineages have traditionally claimed that he was taught by master Dai Longbang. However, many others point to the fact that Longbang had died before Luoneng was born, or when Luoneng was quite young. Combined with the fact that Luoneng only arrived at Dai territory as a traveling adult, others argue that it would have been impossible for him to have studied under Longbang, and suggest his teacher was actually Longbang's student, Guo Weihan.

Another historical controversy relates to who had been the teacher of the founder of Yi Quan, late master Wang Xiangzhai (~1886–1963). Most Yi Quan oral traditions have it that Guo Yunshen, a student of the founder of modern Xing Yi (Li Luoneng), had been Wang Xiangzhai's teacher. However, since Wang was not yet alive (or been a young child) by the time of Guo Yunshen's death, others suggest he must have learnt from Guo's other disciples (Li Bao 李豹 is thought to have been his true main teacher). The chart lists Li Bao as Wang's teacher, and Guo Yunshen as an indirect teacher due to the controversy surrounding the matter (until further historical evidence surfaces).

Cross influences with other martial arts

During the course of the late 19th century and 20th century, there had been a lot of cross-fertilization between notable masters of Xing Yi, and those of Bagua Zhang and Taiji Quan. This has yielded many mutual influences.

Chen Panling's Taiji Quan (originating from Taiwan) has been influenced by Xing Yi and Bagua.

Shanxi style Xing Yi in the line of Song Shirong has incorporated Bagua's Circle Walking practice, in either a circle, or tight squares or triangles (the latter practice referred to as 'Si Bu Pan Gen' – Four Step Base Encirclement).

Cheng Tinghua, a famous student of Bagua founder Dong Hai Chuan, is said to have taught his Bagua to many Xing Yi masters (including Gao Yisheng, Geng Jishan and Sun Lutang, of whom is written in the paragraphs below).

Gao Yisheng's Gao Style Bagua Zhang has incorporated a lot of material from Xing Yi Quan, and his lineage, known as 'Yi Zong', includes the teaching of both arts.

Sun Lutang, one of the most famous practitioner of Xing Yi in the 20th century, had learnt Cheng style Bagua Zhang and Wu/Hao style Taiji Quan after many decades of practicing Xing Yi. He then later went to develop his own unique forms of Bagua and Taiji, which were heavily influenced by his former experience training in Xing Yi.

Many martial arts lines, notably that of Chen style Taiji Quan from Chen village, have begun to practice the Zhan Zhuang posture known as Hun Yuan Zhuang (or Cheng Bao Zhuang) in recent decades. The origin of that posture in modern times is probably either Xing Yi Quan or Yi Quan, as it is basic in the arts' practices.

Contrary to some modern hypothesis proposed by Karate practitioners, Xing Yi was not "created based on Baji Quan and did not "influence greatly the development of Okinawan Karate". Rather, Okinawan Karate was most heavily influenced by southern-Chinese arts. This is well substantiated in historical Karate literature, such as in the works of Patrick McCarthy.

Cultural aspects of Xing Yi

Relationship with Chinese culture
Like all traditional Chinese martial arts, Xing Yi too features a strong bond to the military, religious, philosophical and cultural traditions of China.

Xing Yi's weapons are mostly ones which were used on Chinese battlefields throughout the centuries, with the dao and spear being the most prominent members of that group. Many consider the style to have originally been a 'military art' (as opposed to a sport like boxing, or an urban self-defense system like Wing Chun).

Xing Yi's Five Shapes ('Five Elements') are a borrowed concept from Traditional Chinese Medicine (which in turn had borrowed them from Daoism).

The 12 Animal shapes were influenced, in part, by the Chinese zodiac. The Dragon, being the Chinese mythical animal, begets its supposed physical description and attributes from Chinese lore.

Like all Nei Jia arts, Xing Yi is heavily influenced by Daoism. Its combat meditation methods (Zhan Zhuang) existed in similar forms in Daoism before being integrated into martial arts in later centuries. The whole theory behind "using softness to overcome hardness" and similar ideas have their origins in the Dao De Jing. Daoist concepts are readily implemented into actual training in the practice of Xing Yi. This can be discerned in the following paragraph by Sun Lutang: "Before training,  there is no thought or intention, no figure or image, no self or others, only Qi exists in the chaos of the body. The state is called WuJi in Xing Yi. Without knowing the principle of "inverse motion", people always rigidly adhered to the principle of the "direct motion nature". Hence the internal Qi is restrained and things cannot be properly realized due to an obscure mind that causes the body to be weak. They do not know the principle of health that extreme Yang leads to Yin and extreme Yin leads to death. However, sages can be versed in the way of inverse motion, and control the relation between Yin and Yang, manage the principal of creation, direct Liang Yi (another name for Yin and Yang), grasp the key points, and go back to the pre-natal from the post-natal realm to settle at the original position as the body becomes an integral unit. Its way is nothing more than the principle of stretching and contracting as in post-natal Wu Xing and Bagua boxing. This is called the generation of Qi from WuJi."

Popular culture appearances in modern times
Xing Yi Quan has been featured in various media through the years.

  In the Dead or Alive series of video games, Gen Fu and Eliot employ the style.
  In the Tekken series, Wang Jinrei uses Xing Yi Quan, while Michelle Chang and her daughter, Julia Chang, use Xing Yi mixed with professional wrestling and Bajiquan.
 In the Mortal Kombat series, Shao Kahn employs Xing Yi Quan as well as Tai Tsu Chang Quan.
 Jet Li performed a modern Wushu adaptation of Xing Yi in the 2001 action movie The One (seen used by the hero's evil alternate dimensional self in a multiverse).
  In the manga series Negima!, the title character studies Xing Yi as part of his Chinese martial arts training.
  Xing Yi, as well as XinYi LiuHe Quan, are also featured in the manga series Kenji.
  In the film Ip Man 4: The Finale, supporting character Master Chiang is a female Xing Yi grandmaster.
 In Avatar: The Last Airbender and The Legend of Korra, some techniques of airbendiing and firebending are based on Xing Yi Quan.

See also
 Bagua Zhang	
 Liuhebafa	
 Neijia
 Taijiquan	
 Yiquan

References

Further reading

Xing Yi Lianhuan Quan, Li Cun Yi (Translated by Joseph Crandall)

 (Translated)

External links
 A translation of chapters from Li Zhongxuan's book on Xing Yi Quan practice and history
 Xinyi Liuhe Quan – the secret art of Chinese Muslims: Part One – Brief History

Chinese martial arts
Neijia

Chinese martial arts terminology
Chinese swordsmanship
Wushu (sport)